Diocese of Chersonesus may refer to:

 Roman Catholic Diocese of Chersonesus (disambiguation)
 Russian Orthodox Diocese of Chersonesus